Tabenken, also known as Tangmbo, is a village in the Cameroon in the department of Donga-Mantung, Northwest Region near the border of Nigeria. It is part of commune of Nkambé.

Demographics 
In 1970 the village was inhabited by 5,951 people most of whom where members of the Tang clan. In 2005, it was inhabited by 6,401 people.

Bibliography 
 [http://horizon.documentation.ird.fr/exl-doc/pleins_textes/divers15-04/02886.pdf Village dictionary of Donga-Mantung Division], ORSTOM, Yaoundé, 1973, 80 p.

 External links 
 Nkambé, sur le site Communes et villes unies du Cameroun'' (CVUC)
 Nkambe Council Development Plan, PNDP, March 2012, p. 203

References 

Populated places in Northwest Region (Cameroon)